Dave Barry's Book of Bad Songs is a 1997 humor book written by Miami Herald columnist Dave Barry, chronicling the results of his bad song survey.  The survey started when he wrote a column about a song he thought was particularly bad (Neil Diamond's "I Am...I Said"), and he got such a response that in addition to a follow-up column, he decided to write an entire book about the results of the survey.

The book opens with a warning that it will "put bad songs into your head", and suggests that it instead be given to your enemies as a potent psychological weapon.  This kind of hyperbole is also found in the book's criticism of cheesy or overly sappy lyrics, and is a hallmark of Barry's writing style.

In the book he acknowledges the results are biased because he had arbitrarily limited the survey to songs that were very popular and at least 10 years old, as well as excluding certain songs including ones that were intentionally terrible (despite this, two songs in the top six did not meet the criteria; "Achy Breaky Heart" had only been released six years prior to the survey, and "Timothy" was a song intentionally written for shock value as a publicity stunt).  The survey also likely reflects the demographics of his readership: the large number of middle aged readers resulted in a disproportionate number of oldies being selected.

The worst songs ever, according to the survey, are:
 "MacArthur Park" as sung by Richard Harris (written by Jimmy Webb)
 "Yummy Yummy Yummy (I Got Love In My Tummy)" performed by Ohio Express
 "(You're) Having My Baby" by Paul Anka
 "Honey" by Bobby Goldsboro
 "Timothy" by The Buoys (written by Rupert Holmes)
 "Achy Breaky Heart" by Billy Ray Cyrus

Barry also includes special categories such as:
 Weenie Music
 Love Songs
 Songs Women Really Hate
 Teen Death Songs
 Songs People Get Wrong

Comedy books
1997 books
Works by Dave Barry
Andrews McMeel Publishing books
Books about pop music
Worst
Music